From the Sky is a 2014 short film written and directed by Ian Ebright, who also produced it with Jess Grant. The independently produced drama features an Arab father and son traveling through a region that often experiences drone strikes.

Premise

Hakeem and his son Abbas travel through a region that often experiences drone strikes. Abbas suffers from posttraumatic stress disorder and struggles to keep it under control with the threat of drones. Two men, Dhiya and Samir, visit their camp, and trouble arises.

Cast

Maz Siam ... Hakeem
Mohamad Tamini ... Abbas
Steven Soro ... Dhiya
Georges Chalhoub ... Samir

Production

From the Sky was written, produced, and directed by Ian Ebright, who studied at the Seattle Film Institute and followed news coverage about drone strikes in Asia and the Middle East. He collaborated with Muslims and American advisers on the Middle East and developed an Arabic-language screenplay for the film's production. He used Kickstarter to raise two-thirds of what would be a final budget of $30,000.

Release

The film was nominated for four awards at the Short Film Awards.

See also

 List of films featuring drones

References

External links

How They Did It: Shooting 'From the Sky' in Arabic at MovieMaker
Through The Frame of Ian Ebright's 'From The Sky' at PCP Media

2014 films
2014 drama films
American drama short films
2010s Arabic-language films
2014 short films
2010s American films